Sir Christopher John Slade (2 June 1927 – 7 February 2022) was a British judge who was a Lord Justice of Appeal from 1982 to 1991.

Personal life 
His father was George Penkivil Slade. He had two  brothers (Adrian and  Julian), as well as a sister.

Slade was educated at New College, Oxford, and was awarded the Eldon Scholarship.

Marriage
He married Jane Buckley in 1958. The couple had four children, Lucinda (born 1959), Victoria (born 1962), Richard (born 1963) and Amelia (born 1966).

Death
Slade died on 7 February 2022, at the age of 94.

Judicial decisions
Important judicial decisions of Lord Justice Slade include:
 Re Bond Worth Ltd
 Reckitt & Colman Products Ltd v Borden Inc
 Adams v Cape Industries plc
 Street v Mountford
 Bank of Credit and Commerce International SA v Aboody
 Rolled Steel Products (Holdings) Ltd v British Steel Corp
 Phillips Products Ltd v Hyland and Hamstead Plant Hire Co Ltd
 Aveling Barford Ltd v Perion Ltd
 Mikeover Ltd v Brady
 Powell v McFarlane
 Winkworth v Christie Manson and Woods Ltd

References

1927 births
2022 deaths
Alumni of New College, Oxford
Attorneys-General of the Duchy of Lancaster
20th-century English judges
Knights Bachelor
Members of the Privy Council of the United Kingdom